S. S. Ramasami Padayatchiyar (16 September 1918 – 3 April 1992) was a politician from the Indian state of Tamil Nadu. He was the founder of the Tamil political party Tamil Nadu Toilers' Party, which is considered to be a predecessor of Pattali Makkal Katchi.

Early life 

Padayatchiyar was born in a Vanniyar family at the South Arcot district of Madras Presidency on 16 September 1918. He studied till high school and did not pursue any further education. He entered politics and founded the Tamil Nadu Toilers Party in 1951.

Tamil Nadu Toilers Party
Tamil Nadu Toilers Party was created by Padayatchiyar and members of the Vanniyar caste during the 1950s. In 1951, Vanniyars convened a major conference of the Vanniyar Kula Kshatriya Sangam. M. A. Manickavelu Naicker, a lawyer and S. S. Ramasami Padayatchi, 33-year-old high school graduate, Chairman of the Cuddalore Municipal school and member of the South Arcot district board were participants of the conference among others. The conference which intended to organise Vanniyars on a statewide basis failed due to traditional local loyalties. South Arcot and Salem Vanniyars under Padayatchiyars's leadership formed Tamil Nadu Toilers party whereas Vanniyars from North Arcot and Chengalpattu under Naicker formed Commonweal Party. The partnership of Tamil Nadu toilers party & Commonweal party ensured success in 25 M.L.A. constituencies & 4 members of parliament, after which a problem in Madras legislative assembly on 1954 came to a solution to take referendum in assembly for Indian National Congress to prove its majority to form government, where Kamaraj of INC was supported by S.S. Ramaswamy Padayatchiyar & Manickavelu Naicker to become Chief Minister of Madras presidency.

In the Madras Legislative Assembly 

Padayatchiyar was unsure over the choice of alliances. However, initially, he was highly skeptical of the Indian National Congress and criticized the Commonweal Party for establishing an alliance with the Congress. But he significantly modified his stance when C. Rajagopalachari resigned as the Chief Minister of Madras state. He proposed negotiations with Rajaji's successor K. Kamaraj and eventually, merged his party with the Congress accepting an appointment as Minister of Local Self-Government.

During the 1962 elections, Padayatchiyar quit the Congress and revived the Tamil Nadu Toilers Party. He concluded an alliance with the Swatantra Party and contested the elections as an ally of the Swarajya Party. However, Tamil Nadu Toilers Party performed poorly in the 1962 elections and Padayatchiyar himself lost his seat. During the 1967 elections, Padayatchiyar approached the Dravida Munnetra Kazhagam offering his support. But the DMK rebuffed him saying that there were enough candidates from the Vanniyar community in the DMK and the support of the Tamil Nadu Toilers Party would not be needed. The DMK performed well in the elections and captured power in the state.

As Member of Parliament 

After a brief lull, Padayatchiyar returned to politics in 1980. He returned to the Indian National Congress and contested in the Lok Sabha elections from Tindivanam and was elected to the lower house of Indian Parliament. Padayatchiyar was re-elected in 1984 and served from 1980 to 1989.

Philanthropy 
He donated several acres of his land for public railways, government hospitals, and the bus terminal in Cuddalore.

Memorial for Padayatchiyar 
In memory of Padayatchiyar a portrait was unveiled in Tamilnadu Legislative  Assembly. To honour Padayatchiyar and his Social Justice Service, on 29 June 2018 Chief Minister of Tamil Nadu  Edappadi K. Palaniswami announced in the Assembly that Padayatchiyar birth anniversary on September 16 would be officially celebrated as Government Function. And also announced that a Memorial for Padayatchiyar would be built at Cuddalore. Edappadi K Palaniswami on 14 Sep 2018 laid the foundation for the Memorial at Manjakuppam in Cuddalore, through video conferencing at the Secretariat. The memorial was opened on 25 November 2019 by Chief Minister of Tamil Nadu Edappadi K. Palaniswami in 1.5-acre land in the heart of the Cuddalore city with a life-size bronze statue of the late leader, also with a library at an cost of 2.15 crore.

Family 
Ramasami Padayatchiyar married Papa Ammal and had two sons and one daughter, Vimal.

Death 

Ramasami Padayatchiyar died on 3 April 1992 at Cuddalore.

See also 
 M. A. Manickavelu Naicker
 S. Ramadoss

Notes 

1918 births
1992 deaths
Tamil Nadu politicians
Lok Sabha members from Tamil Nadu
Tamil Nadu ministers
India MPs 1980–1984
India MPs 1984–1989
People from Viluppuram district
Madras MLAs 1952–1957